Sentience is the capacity to experience feelings and sensations. The word was first coined by philosophers in the 1630s for the concept of an ability to feel, derived from Latin sentientem (a feeling), to distinguish it from the ability to think (reason). In modern Western philosophy, sentience is the ability to experience sensations. In different Asian religions, the word 'sentience' has been used to translate a variety of concepts. In science fiction, the word "sentience" is sometimes used interchangeably with "sapience", "self-awareness", or "consciousness".

Some writers differentiate between the mere ability to perceive sensations, such as light or pain, and the ability to perceive emotions, such as fear or grief. The subjective awareness of experiences by a conscious individual are known as qualia in Western philosophy.

Philosophy and sentience
In philosophy, different authors draw different distinctions between consciousness and sentience. According to Antonio Damasio, sentience is a minimalistic way of defining consciousness, which otherwise commonly and collectively describes sentience plus further features of the mind and consciousness, such as creativity, intelligence, sapience, self-awareness, and intentionality (the ability to have thoughts about something). These further features of consciousness may not be necessary for sentience, which is the capacity to feel sensations and emotions.

Consciousness

According to Thomas Nagel in his paper "What Is It Like to Be a Bat?", consciousness can refer to the ability of any entity to have subjective perceptual experiences, or as some philosophers refer to them, "qualia"—in other words, the ability to have states that it feels like something to be in. Some philosophers, notably Colin McGinn, believe that the physical process causing consciousness to happen will never be understood, a position known as "new mysterianism." They do not deny that most other aspects of consciousness are subject to scientific investigation but they argue that qualia will never be explained. Other philosophers, such as Daniel Dennett, argue that qualia are not a meaningful concept.

Regarding animal consciousness, according to the Cambridge Declaration of Consciousness, which was publicly proclaimed on 7 July 2012 at Cambridge University, consciousness is that which requires specialized neural structures, chiefly neuroanatomical, neurochemical, and neurophysiological substrates, which manifests in more complex organisms as the central nervous system, to exhibit consciousness. Accordingly, only organisms that possess these substrates, all within the animal kingdom, are said to be conscious. Sponges, placozoans, and mesozoans, with simple body plans and no nervous system, are the only members of the animal kingdom that possess no consciousness.

Phenomenal vs. affective consciousness

David Chalmers argues that sentience is sometimes used as shorthand for phenomenal consciousness, the capacity to have any subjective experience at all, but sometimes refers to the narrower concept of affective consciousness, the capacity to experience subjective states that have affective valence (i.e., a positive or negative character), such as pain and pleasure.

Recognition paradox and relation to sapience

While it has been traditionally assumed that sentience and sapience are, in principle, independent of each other, there are criticisms of that assumption. One such criticism is about recognition paradoxes, one example of which is that an entity that cannot distinguish a spider from a non-spider cannot be arachnophobic. More generally, it is argued that since it is not possible to attach an emotional response to stimuli that cannot be recognized, emotions cannot exist independently of cognition that can recognize. The claim that precise recognition exists as specific attention to some details in a modular mind is criticized both with regard to data loss as a small system of disambiguating synapses in a module physically cannot make as precise distinctions as a bigger synaptic system encompassing the whole brain, and for energy loss as having one system for motivation that needs some built-in cognition to recognize anything anyway and another cognitive system for making strategies would cost more energy than integrating it all in one system that use the same synapses. Data losses inherent in all information transfer from more precise systems to less precise systems are also argued to make it impossible for any imprecise system to use a more precise system as an "emissary", as a less precise system would not be able to tell whether the outdata from the more precise system was in the interest of the less precise system or not.

Empirical data on conditioned reflex precision
The original studies by Ivan Pavlov that showed that conditioned reflexes in human children are more discriminating than those in dogs, human children salivating only at ticking frequencies very close to those at which food was served while dogs drool at a wider range of frequencies, have been followed up in recent years with comparative studies on more species. It is shown that both brain size and brain-wide connectivity contribute to make perception more discriminating, as predicted by the theory of a brain-wide perception system but not by the theory of separate systems for emotion and cognition.

Eastern religions

Eastern religions including Hinduism, Buddhism, Sikhism, and Jainism recognise non-humans as sentient beings. The term sentient beings is translated from various Sanskrit terms (jantu, bahu jana, jagat, sattva) and "conventionally refers to the mass of living things subject to illusion, suffering, and rebirth (Saṃsāra)". In some forms of Buddhism plants, stones and other inanimate objects are considered to be 'sentient'. In Jainism many things are endowed with a soul, jīva, which is sometimes translated as 'sentience'. Some things are without a soul, ajīva, such as a chair or spoon. There are different rankings of jīva based on the number of senses it has. Water, for example, is a sentient being of the first order, as it is considered to possess only one sense, that of touch.

In Jainism and Hinduism, this is related to the concept of ahimsa, non-violence toward other beings.

Sentience in Buddhism is the state of having senses. In Buddhism, there are six senses, the sixth being the subjective experience of the mind. Sentience is simply awareness prior to the arising of Skandha. Thus, an animal qualifies as a sentient being. According to Buddhism, sentient beings made of pure consciousness are possible. In Mahayana Buddhism, which includes Zen and Tibetan Buddhism, the concept is related to the Bodhisattva, an enlightened being devoted to the liberation of others. The first vow of a Bodhisattva states, "Sentient beings are numberless; I vow to free them."

Animal welfare, rights, and sentience

Sentience has been a central concept in the animal rights movement, tracing back to the well-known writing of Jeremy Bentham in An Introduction to the Principles of Morals and Legislation: "The question is not, Can they reason? nor, Can they talk? but, Can they suffer?"

Richard D. Ryder defines sentientism broadly as the position according to which an entity has moral status if and only if it is sentient. In David Chalmer's more specific terminology, Bentham is a narrow sentientist, since his criterion for moral status is not only the ability to experience any phenomenal consciousness at all, but specifically the ability to experience conscious states with negative affective valence (i.e. suffering). Animal welfare and rights advocates often invoke similar capacities. For example, the documentary Earthlings argues that while animals do not have all the desires and ability to comprehend as do humans, they do share the desires for food and water, shelter and companionship, freedom of movement and avoidance of pain.

Animal-welfare advocates typically argue that any sentient being is entitled, at a minimum, to protection from unnecessary suffering, though animal-rights advocates may differ on what rights (e.g., the right to life) may be entailed by simple sentience. Sentiocentrism describes the theory that sentient individuals are the center of moral concern.

Gary Francione also bases his abolitionist theory of animal rights, which differs significantly from Singer's, on sentience. He asserts that, "All sentient beings, humans or nonhuman, have one right: the basic right not to be treated as the property of others."

Andrew Linzey, founder of the Oxford Centre for Animal Ethics in England, considers recognising animals as sentient beings as an aspect of his Christianity. The Interfaith Association of Animal Chaplains encourages animal ministry groups to adopt a policy of recognising and valuing sentient beings.

In 1997 the concept of animal sentience was written into the basic law of the European Union. The legally binding protocol annexed to the Treaty of Amsterdam recognises that animals are "sentient beings", and requires the EU and its member states to "pay full regard to the welfare requirements of animals".

Alleged sentience of artificial intelligence
It is a subject of debate as to whether artificial intelligence can potentially display, or has displayed, the level of awareness and cognitive ability required of sentience in animals. Notably, the discussion on the topic of alleged sentience of artificial intelligence has been reignited as a result of recent (as of mid-2022) claims made about Google's LaMDA artificial intelligence system that it is "sentient" and had a "soul." LaMDA (Language Model for Dialogue Applications) is an artificial intelligence system that creates chatbots — AI robots designed to communicate with humans — by gathering vast amounts of text from the internet and using algorithms to respond to queries in the most fluid and natural way possible. The transcripts of conversations between scientists and LaMDA reveal that the AI system excels at this, providing answers to challenging topics about the nature of emotions, generating Aesop-style fables on the moment, and even describing its alleged fears.

However, the term "sentience" is not used by major artificial intelligence textbooks and researchers. It is sometimes used in popular accounts of AI to describe "human level or higher intelligence" (or artificial general intelligence).

Sentience quotient

The sentience quotient concept was introduced by Robert A. Freitas Jr. in the late 1970s. It defines sentience as the relationship between the information processing rate of each individual processing unit (neuron), the weight/size of a single unit, and the total number of processing units (expressed as mass). It was proposed as a measure for the sentience of all living beings and computers from a single neuron up to a hypothetical being at the theoretical computational limit of the entire universe. On a logarithmic scale it runs from −70 up to +50.

See also

 Blindsight
 Causality
 Ethics of uncertain sentience
 Explanatory gap
 Hard problem of consciousness
 Ideasthesia
 Mind-body problem
 Mirror test
 Omniscience
 Pain in invertebrates
 Philosophical zombie
 Philosophy of mind
 Problem of other minds
 Solipsism
 Turing test
 Wisdom

Notes

a.  Quote: "The absence of a neocortex does not appear to preclude an organism from experiencing affective states. Convergent evidence indicates that non-human animals have the neuroanatomical, neurochemical, and neurophysiological substrates of conscious states along with the capacity to exhibit intentional behaviors. Consequently, the weight of evidence indicates that humans are not unique in possessing the neurological substrates that generate consciousness. Non-human animals, including all mammals and birds, and many other creatures, including octopuses, also possess these neurological substrates."

b.  Quote: "Granted, these animals do not have all the desires we humans have; granted, they do not comprehend everything we humans comprehend; nevertheless, we and they do have some of the same desires and do comprehend some of the same things. The desires for food and water, shelter and companionship, freedom of movement and avoidance of pain."

References

Further reading
 Sugunasiri, Suwanda H.J., The Whole Body, not Heart, as 'Seat of Consciousness': the Buddha's View', Philosophy East & West, vol. 45, no. 3, pp. 409–430). Prof. Sugunasiri is Founder of Nalanda College of Buddhist Studies, Toronto, Canada
 Jeremy Bentham - Introduction to the Principles of Morals and Legislation
 Book about A Theory of Sentience Readership: Philosophers, psychologists, and neuroscientists interested in sensation and perception. Authors, Austen Clark, Professor of Philosophy, University of Connecticut, Storrs
 D. Cole: Sense and Sentience SENSE5 8/18/90; rev. 1-19-98. (original 1983) copyright David Cole University of Minnesota, Duluth
 Science, policy and cultural implications of animal sentience, Suggested Reading, Compassion in World Farming

 

Animal ethics
Animal rights
Consciousness studies
Personhood
Philosophy of mind
Subjective experience